The common goldeneye or simply goldeneye (Bucephala clangula) is a medium-sized sea duck of the genus Bucephala, the goldeneyes. Its closest relative is the similar Barrow's goldeneye. The genus name is derived from the Ancient Greek boukephalos ("bullheaded", from bous, "bull " and kephale, "head"), a reference to the bulbous head shape of the bufflehead. The species name is derived from the Latin clangere ("to resound").

Common goldeneyes are aggressive and territorial ducks, and have elaborate courtship displays.

Description
The common goldeneye has a wingspan of 30.3-32.7 in (77-83 cm). The species is named for its golden-yellow eye. Adult males have a dark head with a greenish gloss and a circular white patch below the eye, a dark back and a white neck and belly. Adult females have a brown head and a mostly grey body. Their legs and feet are orange-yellow.

Two subspecies are generally recognized, the nominate Eurasian subspecies Bucephala clangula clangula and the North American B. c. americana. americana has a longer and thicker bill than clangula.

Habitat and breeding
Their breeding habitat is the taiga. They are found in the lakes and rivers of boreal forests across Canada and the northern United States, Scotland, Scandinavia, the Baltic States, and northern Russia. They are migratory and most winter in protected coastal waters or open inland waters at more temperate latitudes. Naturally, they nest in cavities in large trees, where they return year after year, though they will readily use nest boxes as well.

Natural tree cavities chosen for nest sites include those made by broken limbs and those made by large woodpeckers, specifically pileated woodpeckers or black woodpeckers. The incubation period ranges from 28 to 32 days. The female does all the incubating and is abandoned by the male about 1 to 2 weeks into incubation. The young remain in the nest for about 24–36 hours. Brood parasitism is quite common with other common goldeneyes, and occurs less frequently with other duck species. The broods commonly start to mix with other females' broods as they become more independent or are abandoned by their mothers. Goldeneye young have been known to be competitively killed by other goldeneye mothers, common loons and red-necked grebes. The young are capable of flight at 55–65 days of age.

Diet
Common goldeneyes are diving birds that forage underwater. Year-round, about 32% of their prey is crustaceans, 28% is aquatic insects and 10% is molluscs. Insects are the predominant prey while nesting and crustaceans are the predominant prey during migration and winter. Locally, fish eggs and aquatic plants can be important foods. They themselves may fall prey to various hawks, owls and eagles, while females and their broods have been preyed upon by bears (Ursus spp.), various weasels (Mustela spp.), mink (Mustela vison), raccoons (Procyon lotor) and even northern flickers (Colaptes auratus) and red squirrels (Tamiasciurus husonicus).

Conservation
The common goldeneye is one of the species to which the Agreement on the Conservation of African-Eurasian Migratory Waterbirds (AEWA) applies. Approximately 188,300 common goldeneyes were killed annually by duck hunters in North America during the 1970s, representing slightly less than 4% of the total waterfowl killed in Canada during that period, and less than 1% of the total waterfowl killed in the US. Both the breeding and winter habitat of these birds has been degraded by clearance and pollution. However, the common goldeneye in North America is known to derive short-term benefits from lake acidification.

Gallery

References

External links

 
 Common Goldeneye Species Account – Cornell Lab of Ornithology
 Common Goldeneye - Bucephala clangula - USGS Patuxent Bird Identification InfoCenter
 eNature.com: Common Goldeneye
 Common Goldeneye wildlife photos and voice at nature-photos.org
 Feathers of Common Goldeneye (Bucephala clangula) at ornithos.de
 
 

common goldeneye
Holarctic birds
common goldeneye
Taxa named by Carl Linnaeus